The Local Government Act 1976, is a Malaysian laws which enacted to revise and consolidate the laws relating to local government.

Preamble
WHEREAS it is expedient for the purpose only of ensuring uniformity of law and policy to make a law with respect to local government:

Structure
The Local Government Act 1976, in its current form (1 December 2012), consists of 16 Parts containing 166 sections and 2 schedules (including 7 amendments).
 Part I: Preliminary
 Part II: Administration of Local Authorities
 Part III: Officers and Employees of Local Authorities
 Part IV: Conduct of Business
 Part V: General Financial Provisions
 Part VI: Accounts and Audit
 Part VII: Public Places
 Part VIII: Pollution of Streams
 Part IX: Food, Markets, Sanitation and Nuisances
 Part X: Fire Services
 Part XI: Burial Places, Crematoria and Exhumation
 Part XII: Further Powers of Local Authority
 Part XIII: By-Laws
 Part XIV: Miscellaneous
 Part XV: Rating and Valuation
 Part XVI: Special Provisions
 Schedules

See also
Local Government Act

References

External links
 Local Government Act 1976 

1976 in Malaysian law
Malaysian federal legislation